Yellowknife is a 2002 Canadian film directed by Rodrigue Jean and starring Sébastien Huberdeau, Hélène Florent, Patsy Gallant, Philippe Clément, Brad Mann, Todd Mann and Glen Gould.

Plot
Max (Sébastien Huberdeau) and Linda (Hélène Florent) travel from New Brunswick to the Northwest Territories. Along the way, they hook up with two other couples: two strippers and a night-club singer and her manager. The relationships along the way take them as far as their desperate and receding passions allow.

Cast
 Sébastien Huberdeau ...  Max
 Hélène Florent ...  Linda
 Patsy Gallant ...  Marlène Bédard
 Philippe Clément ...  Johnny
 Brad Mann ...  Bill
 Todd Mann ...  Billy
 Glen Gould ...  George
 Claude Lemieux ...  Raymond
 Jean Clément
 Jennifer Cook
 Marie-Thérèse François
 Claudia Boudreau ...  Barmaid

Awards
 Nomination, Best Supporting Actress (Meilleure Actrice de Soutien), Patsy Gallant, Jutra Awards 2003
 Nomination, Best Score (Meilleure Musique Originale), Robert Marcel Lepage, Jutra Awards 2003

References

External links
 
 K-Films Yellowknife page

2002 films
Canadian drama films
English-language Canadian films
Films directed by Rodrigue Jean
Incest in film
2000s English-language films
2000s Canadian films